KGSP may refer to:

KGSP (FM)
Greenville–Spartanburg International Airport
Korean Government Scholarship Program